Zeta potential titration is a titration of heterogeneous systems, for example  colloids and emulsions. Solids in such systems have very high surface area. This type of titration is used to study the zeta potential of these surfaces under different conditions. Details of zeta potential definition and measuring techniques can be found in the International Standard.

Iso-electric Point

The iso-electric point is one such property. The iso-electric point is the pH value at which the zeta potential is approximately zero. At a pH near the iso-electric point (± 2 pH units), colloids are usually unstable; the particles tend to coagulate or flocculate. Such titrations use acids or bases as titration reagents. Tables of iso-electric points for different materials are available. The attached figure illustrates results of such titrations for concentrated dispersions of alumina (4% v/v) and rutile (7% v/v). It is seen that iso-electric point of alumina is around pH 9.3, whereas for rutile it is around pH 4. Alumina is unstable in the pH range from 7 to 11. Rutile is unstable in the pH range from 2 to 6.

Surfactants and Stabilization
Another purpose of this titration is determination of the optimum dose of surfactant for achieving stabilization or flocculation of a heterogeneous system.

Measurement
In a zeta-potential titration, the Zeta potential is the indicator. Measurement of the zeta potential can be performed using microelectrophoresis, or electrophoretic light scattering, or electroacoustic phenomena. The last method makes possible to perform titrations in concentrated systems, with no dilution.

References

Further reading

 Kosmulski M. (2009). Surface Charging and Points of Zero Charge. CRC Press; 1st edition (Hardcover).

Category

Chemical mixtures
Colloidal chemistry
Condensed matter physics
Soft matter
Titration